David S. Schweikert (born March 3, 1962) is an American politician and businessman serving as the U.S. representative for  from  2013 to 2023 and  since 2023. A member of the Republican Party, he first entered Congress in 2011, representing  until redistricting. His district includes most of northern Phoenix as well as Scottsdale, Paradise Valley, and Cave Creek.

Schweikert served two terms in the Arizona State House of Representatives (1991–1994), chaired the state Board of Equalization (1995–2004), and was the elected Maricopa County Treasurer (2004–2007). He ran for the U.S. House of Representatives twice (losing the primary to J. D. Hayworth in 1994 and the general election to incumbent Harry Mitchell in 2008) before being elected in 2010.

Early life and education
Schweikert was born in Los Angeles, California, to an unwed teenage mother, Mary Lynn Sheridan. According to Schweikert, Sheridan had considered an abortion but chose instead to place him for adoption. He grew up in Scottsdale with his adoptive parents and two adopted siblings. He graduated from Saguaro High School in 1980, then earned a Bachelor of Science degree in finance and real estate in 1985 and an MBA from Arizona State University's W. P. Carey School of Business.

Early career

Arizona House of Representatives (1991–1995)
Schweikert was elected to the Arizona State House of Representatives for District 28 in 1990 and reelected in 1992. He represented Fountain Hills and part of Scottsdale. He arrived in the wake of the AzScam scandal, and was a committee chair as a freshman and majority whip in his second term.

Local politics (1995–2007)
Schweikert was appointed chair of the Arizona State Board of Equalization, a full-time job, and served from 1995 to 2003. As chair, he oversaw billions of dollars in valuations and tax protests from Arizona citizens and businesses. There was speculation in 1999 that Arizona Governor Jane Dee Hull might appoint him to the Arizona Corporation Commission.

Schweikert was appointed Chief Deputy Treasurer of Maricopa County in 2004 and elected treasurer the same year. He resigned in 2007 to run for Congress again.

U.S. House of Representatives

Elections

1994
Schweikert ran in the September Republican primary in Arizona's 6th congressional district. It resembled the 5th district formed after the 2000 census, but also included most of the northeastern part of the state, including Flagstaff and the Navajo reservation. J.D. Hayworth defeated him, 45%–22%. After that defeat, Schweikert took time to reconsider and left for a lengthy vacation, which included travel to Calcutta, the Philippines, Myanmar, Nepal, Vietnam and Serbia.

2008

Schweikert won a six-way Republican primary election on September 2 with 30% of the vote, compared to 27% for his nearest rival, Susan Bitter Smith.

Several organizations endorsed Schweikert in the election, including the primary: Club for Growth, the Arizona Police Association, Arizona Right to Life, and the Arizona Medical Association. He received more than $500,000 from the Club for Growth.

Schweikert lost to freshman incumbent Democrat Harry Mitchell, 53%–44%. He later blamed his defeat on the very bitter primary fight that preceded it.

2010

Schweikert sought a rematch with Mitchell in 2010, with Libertarian Nick Coons also running. Schweikert won the Republican primary on August 24 with 37% of the vote. The Club for Growth again endorsed Schweikert after having sat out the competitive primary.

On November 2, Schweikert defeated Mitchell, 52%–43%.

2012

After redistricting, the bulk of Schweikert's former territory became the 9th district, while his home in Fountain Hills was drawn into the newly created 4th district. But as soon as the maps were released, Schweikert announced he would run in the 6th district. That district had previously been the 3rd, represented by fellow Republican freshman Ben Quayle. In a statement announcing his reelection plans, Schweikert pointed out that he had grown up in Scottsdale—most of which had been drawn into the 6th as well—had represented it in both the state house and in Congress, and owned a second home there. A revised map, however, placed Schweikert's Fountain Hills home in the reconfigured 6th.

Quayle, whose home in Phoenix had been drawn into the 9th but was just outside the boundaries of the 6th, opted to seek reelection in the 6th as well. During the bitter primary, Schweikert was widely criticized for a mailer that accused Quayle of "going both ways", suggesting that he was bisexual. On the reverse, the mailer listed issues on which it claimed Quayle had taken both liberal and conservative positions. Senator Jon Kyl, who had represented the district from 1987 to 1995, said that "such campaign tactics insult the voters, degrade politics and expose those who stoop to them as unworthy of high office", and Senator John McCain said the mailer was one of the "worst that I have seen" and that it "crosses the boundary of decent political dialogue and discourse." Quayle's spokeswoman called the mailer "utterly false" and "a sleazy smear tactic." Schweikert's spokesman responded that people "should get their minds out of the gutter" because the mailer was "obviously" referring to "'both ways'—as in liberal and conservative." The Arizona Republic asked two political scientists to review the mailer; both said that they had "never seen anybody accuse someone of flip-flopping [on political issues] that way" and said that it was "difficult to believe" that the sexual suggestion was unintentional.

Although the 6th contained almost two-thirds of Quayle's constituents, Schweikert defeated Quayle in the primary–the real contest in what was then a heavily Republican district–53% to 47%. He was reelected with 62% of the vote.

2014

Schweikert was easily reelected in 2014, winning over 60% of the vote.

2016 

Schweikert was easily reelected in 2016, winning over 60% of the vote.

2018 

In 2018, Democratic tech executive Anita Malik held him to only 55% of the vote despite spending very little money. Malik won 44%, the first time a Democrat had crossed the 40% mark in what is now the 6th since 1976, when Eldon Rudd won election by only 707 votes in what was then the 4th District (the district was numbered as the 3rd from 2003 to 2013, and has been the 6th since 2013).

2020 

In 2020, Schweikert was challenged by Democrat Hiral Tipirneni, who had run in the neighboring 8th district two years earlier. The Cook Political Report rated the race a tossup, partly due to the district's changing demographics. According to Cook Political Report, the 6th has the most college graduates in Arizona; in recent years, college graduates had trended away from the GOP. Schweikert defeated Tipirneni with 52% of the vote.

2022 

In 2022, Schweikert ran for reelection in the newly redrawn 1st district. He defeated Democratic nominee Jevin Hodge in the general election by just 3,195 votes.

Tenure

116th Congress (2019-2021)

Schweikert joined Representatives Andy Biggs and Paul Gosar in voting against the Consolidated Appropriations Act, 2021. He called it "one of the more difficult votes I've ever had to make." While the bill included some components he helped write, he voted against it due to the limited time to read the bill in its entirety.

In 2018, the United States House Committee on Ethics launched an investigation into Schweikert and his chief of staff, Oliver Schwab, over misuse of funds. On July 30, 2020, Schweikert admitted to 11 violation counts and agreed to an official reprimand by the House and a $50,000 fine. The committee found undisclosed loans and campaign contributions; misuse of campaign contributions for personal use; improper spending by his office; and pressuring staffers to do political work. The House Ethics Committee also faulted him for evasive, misleading, and stalling tactics that helped him skirt more serious violations. The report laid out a "surprisingly sizable amount of misconduct over a seven year period." Schweikert said these were inadvertent errors, but the committee reported that "the weight of the evidence" did not support his contention.

117th Congress (2021-2023)

On January 6, 2021, Schweikert was at the U.S. Capitol to certify the 2020 presidential electoral college votes when the Capitol was stormed. He and his staff sheltered in place as the rioters attacked the Capitol. Schweikert did not object to counting Arizona's votes but did object to counting Pennsylvania's. In the wake of the storming of the Capitol, Schweikert voted against the second impeachment of Trump for his role in inciting the attack. In March 2021, he voted against the American Rescue Plan Act of 2021.

As of August 2022, Schweikert had voted in line with Joe Biden's stated position 11% of the time.

Schweikert voted against the Infrascructure Investment and Jobs Act.

Committee assignments
For the 117th United States Congress, Schweikert serves on the following committees:
Committee on Ways and Means
 Subcommittee on Health
Subcommittee on Select Revenue Measures
Joint Economic Committee

The House Republican Steering Committee removed Schweikert from the Committee on Financial Services in late 2012 as part of a larger party leadership-caucus shift. He, Justin Amash and Tim Huelskamp wrote to Speaker of the House John Boehner asking why they had lost their committee posts. Politico quoted a spokesperson for Representative Lynn Westmoreland saying that Schweikert, Amash and Huelskamp were removed for "their inability to work with other members."

Caucus memberships 
 Freedom Caucus (left caucus in 2023)
Congressional Western Caucus
U.S.–Japan Caucus
Republican Study Committee

Political positions

Abortion 
Schweikert is anti-abortion. He has attributed his opposition to abortion to his own adoption.

Schweikert supports the Hyde Amendment, a rider to appropriations bills that bars federal funds from being spent on abortions, and supports making it permanent. He opposes funding for Planned Parenthood in any form, and supported legislation to bar the group from participating in any federally funded program. He supported the 2022 overturning of Roe v. Wade.

Cannabis 
Schweikert has a "B" rating from NORML for his voting record on cannabis-related matters. He supports allowing veterans access to medical marijuana, if legal in their state, per their Veterans Health Administration doctor's recommendation, and voted twice in support of this in the Veterans Equal Access Amendment.

Environment and energy policy 
Schweikert has questioned whether humans are causing climate change.

Foreign policy and defense policy 
Schweikert opposes closing the Guantanamo Bay detention camp. He opposed the international agreement with Iran on its nuclear program, calling it "disastrous." In 2015, Schweikert was one of 26 Republicans to vote against a Republican leadership-sponsored defense spending proposal; he took issue with increases to defense spending without corresponding offsets.

In September 2021, Schweikert was among 75 House Republicans to vote against the National Defense Authorization Act of 2022, which contains a provision that would require women to be drafted.

Schweikert was among 19 House Republicans to vote against the final passage of the 2022 National Defense Authorization Act.

In 2023, Schweikert was among 47 Republicans to vote in favor of H.Con.Res. 21 which directed President Joe Biden to remove U.S. troops from Syria within 180 days.

Gun policy 
In 2015, Schweikert introduced legislation to remove firearm sales and ammunition from the Federal Deposit Insurance Corporation's list of high-risk industries. In 2016, he introduced legislation to remove the District of Columbia's requirement that people seeking concealed carry permits demonstrate a "good reason" to do so.

Economic policy 
Schweikert is an outspoken opponent of the Dodd–Frank Wall Street Reform and Consumer Protection Act, which imposed new financial regulations after the Great Recession. He opposes the Consumer Financial Protection Bureau and the Volcker Rule.

Schweikert supported legislation to kill an Obama administration Department of Labor requirement that established a fiduciary standard for retirement and pension advisers, requiring that such advisers put their clients' financial interests ahead of their own.

Schweikert opposed Obama's budget in 2011, objecting to appropriations to expand the Smithsonian, conduct research, and build high-speed rail.

In 2015, Schweikert was one of 17 Republicans to oppose the Republican budget, arguing that it did not sufficiently address mandatory spending on entitlement programs. He has called for cutting spending on Medicare and Social Security, arguing that "hard choices" must be made.

Schweikert voted for the Tax Cuts and Jobs Act of 2017.

In November 2011, Schweikert wrote a letter to Obama objecting to $70,000 spent by the State Department on books Obama wrote, asking him to return the royalties.

Iraq
In June 2021, Schweikert was one of 49 House Republicans to vote to repeal the AUMF against Iraq.

Antitrust bill
In 2022, Schweikert was one of 39 Republicans to vote for the Merger Filing Fee Modernization Act of 2022, an antitrust package that would crack down on corporations for anti-competitive behavior.

Veterans 
Schweikert voted against the PACT Act, intended to significantly improve healthcare access and funding for veterans who were exposed to toxic substances during military service.

Personal life 
Schweikert and his wife, Joyce, live in Fountain Hills, Arizona. They adopted a daughter in 2015 and a son in 2022. Schweikert is Roman Catholic.

Electoral history

See also
 List of United States representatives expelled, censured, or reprimanded

References

External links

 Congressman David Schweikert official U.S. House website
 David Schweikert for Congress
 
 
 

|-

|-

|-

|-

|-

1962 births
21st-century American politicians
American adoptees
American real estate brokers
American Roman Catholics
Catholics from Arizona
Censured or reprimanded members of the United States House of Representatives
Arizona politicians convicted of crimes
Living people
Republican Party members of the Arizona House of Representatives
Members of the United States Congress stripped of committee assignment
People from Fountain Hills, Arizona
Politicians from Scottsdale, Arizona
Politicians from Los Angeles
Republican Party members of the United States House of Representatives from Arizona
W. P. Carey School of Business alumni